This is a list of pickled foods. Many various types of foods are pickled to preserve them and add flavor. Some of these foods also qualify as fermented foods.

Pickled foods

A

B

C

 
 
 
 Champoy – Myrica rubra pickled in salt, sugar, and vinegar from the Philippines

D

E

 
 
 Encurtido – a pickled vegetable appetizer, side dish and condiment in the Mesoamerican region

F

G

 
 
 
 
 
  – sometimes referred to as dilly beans

H

J

K

L

M

N

O

 Onions

P

 
  
 
 
  – also referred to as pickled pork
 Pickled carrot – a carrot that has been pickled in a brine, vinegar, or other solution and left to ferment for a period of time

R

S

  
 
 
 
 {{annotated 
link|Edible
 sausage
seaweed|Seaweed}}

T
 
  
  
 
 
Turnip - Lebanese pickle with bertroot for red coloring.

U

W

Z

See also

References

External links
 

Pickled
Food preservation
 
Condiments